Paul Siebels (born 13 January 1912, date of death unknown) was a Belgian rower. He competed in the men's coxed four at the 1936 Summer Olympics.

References

1912 births
Year of death missing
Belgian male rowers
Olympic rowers of Belgium
Rowers at the 1936 Summer Olympics
Place of birth missing